Benjamin Gilmour (born 1975) is an Australian German poet, author and film-maker. He is known for writing and directing Jirga (2018), Son of a Lion (2007) and Paramedico (2012). His books include Paramedico, Warrior Poets and The Gap.

Biography 
He was born in Germany but soon moved to Australia. He grew up in Lane Cove, Sydney.

Career 
Gilmour is the author of several books on his filmmaking in Pakistan and Afghanistan. His first non-fiction book Warrior Poets - Guns, movie-making and the Wild West of Pakistan was published in 2008 and details his time living among the Pashtun tribes of the Northwest Frontier. The book was based on his directing of the feature film Son of a Lion (2007). His third book The Gap was released in 2019. He is also the author of an illustrated book for children The Travel Bug and two volumes of poetry, The Song of a Hundred Miles and Night Swim.

His award-winning feature film Jirga was released in 2018 and premiered at the Toronto International Film Festival. Jirga won the AACTA Award for Best Independent Film and the CineFestOz Film Prize. Gilmour won a NSW Premier's Prize for the script of Jirga.  Jirga was also selected as Australia's entry to the 91st Academy Awards in the Best Foreign Language Film section.

Gilmour is also a qualified paramedic and has worked in public health development in low-middle income nations. His best-selling book Paramedico - Around the World by Ambulance (2012) was released at the same time as the documentary Paramedico which Gilmour also produced. Paramedico the documentary was nominated for the Foxtel Best Documentary Award at the Sydney Film Festival.

Bibliography

Books Authored 

 Song of a Hundred Miles - 1998. 
 Warrior Poets - 2010. 
 Paramedico - 2012
 The Travel Bug - 2011 
 Camera's & Kalashnikovs - 2018
 The Gap - 2019
 Night Swim - 2020

Filmography

References 

Living people
1975 births
Australian poets
Australian film directors